VVV may refer to:

 VVV (magazine), a surrealist publication
 VVV-Venlo, a Dutch football team
 Varsity Victory Volunteers, a Japanese-American paramilitary unit in Hawaii
 Venus Versus Virus (a.k.a. V.V.V.), a manga by Atsushi Suzumi
 Vereniging voor Vreemdelingenverkeer, the tourist board of the Netherlands
 Vereeniging voor Vrouwenkiesrecht, the Dutch Association for Women's Suffrage
 Vista Variables in the Via Lactea, an astronomical survey of the bulge and disk of our galaxy
 Valvrave the Liberator, a Japanese mecha anime series
 Valhalla Vintage Verb, a computer program that creates reverberation effects for music production
 Victoria Velasquez Vincent, a Filipino heritage conservationist and beauty queen.

See also
 VV (disambiguation)